Mohammed Amal El-Hajji,  known as Kamal El-Hajji, is a British Security Official and civil servant. From February 2016 to 2019 he was the Serjeant at Arms of the House of Commons, replacing Lawrence Ward. He had formerly been the Head of Front of House and VIP Relations at the Ministry of Justice headquarters, based at 102 Petty France.

Career

Since 2004, El-Hajji held a number of security and operational roles in the Department for Constitutional Affairs, and later the Ministry of Justice. From 2010 to 2015, he worked as the Head of Front of House and VIP Relations at the Ministry of Justice headquarters at 102 Petty France in London.

In 2015, El-Hajji was chosen by a panel of MPs headed by the Speaker of the House of Commons, John Bercow, to replace Lawrence Ward, who had retired in September 2015, as the next Serjeant-at-Arms of the House of Commons.

Honours
In the 2015 New Year Honours, El-Hajji was awarded the British Empire Medal (BEM) "for services to the Ministry of Justice"

References

Serjeants-at-Arms of the British House of Commons
Living people
Moroccan emigrants to the United Kingdom
Recipients of the British Empire Medal
Naturalised citizens of the United Kingdom
Year of birth missing (living people)